Wire is the self-titled fourteenth studio album by British post-punk band Wire. It was released on 13 April 2015 through the band's Pinkflag label.

Background
The material on the album is a combination of songs which were written and performed live on tour preceding the recording and material written by Colin Newman just prior to entering the studio. The band chose eleven songs out of nineteen they’d been preparing, and Newman has stated that the band will issue the remaining material in “… a second release, probably early next year.” Although he later confirmed that this material would be released in April 2016 as Read & Burn 04., the subsequent album was instead entitled Nocturnal Koreans.

According to the band's official webpage for the release, Wire is the first time that guitarist Matthew Simms, who joined in 2012, was heavily involved in the creation of album material. Colin Newman said of Simms: "This is the first album where Matt's been involved in the whole process. It would be overstating to say that we're in a Renaissance, but we are definitely getting somewhere, and I think that Matt is very much part of that."

Track listing

Personnel
Adapted from the album liner notes.

Wire
Colin Newman – lead vocals, electric guitar, baritone electric guitar [1, 7, 8, 11], acoustic guitar [1, 2, 8], keyboards, mandola [6], production, engineering, mixing
Graham Lewis – bass guitar, high bass guitar [3], backing vocals [1, 4, 9, 10], keyboards [6], bass fx [6], vox pop [6] 
Robert Grey – drum kit, water tank [6]
Matthew Simms – electric guitar, 12-string electric guitar [2, 3, 9], lap steel guitar [3, 6], keyboards [1, 2, 4, 6], modular synth [4—6, 8—10], fx [11], loop [8]

Production
Sean Douglas – engineering (at Rockfield Studios and Brighton Electric)
Denis Blackham – mastering
Jon Wozencroft – art direction, photography

Charts

See also
List of 2015 albums

References

External links

Wire (band) albums
2015 albums
Albums recorded at Rockfield Studios